State Highway 1 (SH-1) is a state highway in Boundary County, in the U.S. state of Idaho. It extends  from U.S. Route 95 (US-95) east of Copeland, north to British Columbia Highway 21 (BC 21) in Porthill. The route serves as a connector between Bonners Ferry, via US-95 south, Porthill, and Creston, BC. The highway is one of two border crossings from Idaho into British Columbia. The other crossing is at the US-95/BC 95 in Eastport. The highway is also known for being the only state highway in Boundary County, the two other highways are US-95 and US-2. The highway is also part of the International Selkirk Loop, the only international scenic byway in North America.

Route description
SH-1 runs  from U.S. Route 95 (US-95) east of Copeland, north to BC 21 in Porthill. The route links Bonners Ferry, via US-95 south, Porthill, and Creston, BC. The road is the only state highway in Boundary County, the two other highways are US-95 and US-2. The highway starts at an intersection with US-95 east of Copeland.

History
SH-1 was originally created in the 1920s as part of Sampson Trail B, which ran from Boise north to Lewiston, Coeur d'Alene, before entering British Columbia at Porthill. Later in the mid-1930s, Idaho adopted a new numbered highway system with SH-1 as one of the first highways. The International Selkirk Loop, which uses SH-1, was formed in 1999. The loop became an Idaho Scenic byway on January 21, 2004 as the Wild Horse Trail.

Major intersections

See also

 List of state highways in Idaho
 List of highways numbered 1

References

External links

001
Transportation in Boundary County, Idaho